Shapwick is a village on the Polden Hills overlooking the Somerset Moors, in the Sedgemoor district of Somerset, England. It is situated to the west of Glastonbury.

History

Shapwick is the site of one end of the Sweet Track, a 6,000-year-old, ancient, wooden causeway, dating from the 39th century BC.

In 1998 a hoard of 9,238 silver denarii (the second largest hoard ever found from the Roman Empire, and the largest in the United Kingdom) was discovered in the remains of a previously unknown Roman villa near Shapwick. Following a Treasure Inquest in Taunton, the hoard was valued and acquired in its entirety by Somerset County Museums Service for the sum of £265,000. It became known as the Shapwick Hoard.

The parish of Shapwick was part of the Whitley Hundred.

Due to the plan of its roads and streets academics have described it as a "typical English village". Shapwick is one of the nine Thankful Villages in Somerset — those that suffered no casualties in World War I.

Manor

The manor of Shapwick originally belonged to Glastonbury Abbey, forming part of its Pouholt (Polden) estate in 729. It was divided into two halves in medieval times. After the dissolution of the monasteries the manor passed to Thomas Walton and then to the Rolle family.

Shapwick House was built by Sir Henry Rolle in 1630 in place of the original manor house. The property was sold in 1786/7 by Denys Rolle (1725-1797) of Stevenstone in Devon, to George Templer (1755-1819) of the East India Company 4th son of James I Templer (1722–1782) of Stover, Teigngrace. Shapwick House is a Grade II* listed building and is now an hotel. Originally it was moated but the moat was filled in during the rebuilding by Henry Bull in the first quarter of the 17th century.

The manor house (Shapwick Manor, previously known as Down House) was built after the manor was split in two. It dates from around 1475.  Shapwick Manor is also a Grade II* listed building.

Governance

The parish council has responsibility for local issues, including setting an annual precept (local rate) to cover the council's operating costs and producing annual accounts for public scrutiny. The parish council evaluates local planning applications and works with the local police, district council officers, and neighbourhood watch groups on matters of crime, security, and traffic. The parish council's role also includes initiating projects for the maintenance and repair of parish facilities, as well as consulting with the district council on the maintenance, repair, and improvement of highways, drainage, footpaths, public transport, and street cleaning. Conservation matters (including trees and listed buildings) and environmental issues are also the responsibility of the council.

The village falls within the Non-metropolitan district of Sedgemoor, which was formed on 1 April 1974 under the Local Government Act 1972, having previously been part of Bridgwater Rural District, which is responsible for local planning and building control, local roads, council housing, environmental health, markets and fairs, refuse collection and recycling, cemeteries and crematoria, leisure services, parks, and tourism.

Somerset County Council is responsible for running the largest and most expensive local services such as education, social services, libraries, highways, public transport, fire service, trading standards, waste disposal and strategic planning.  Policing is provided by the Avon and Somerset Constabulary.

It is also part of the Bridgwater and West Somerset county constituency represented in the House of Commons of the Parliament of the United Kingdom. It elects one member of parliament (MP) by the first past the post system of election.

Geography

Shapwick Heath is a biological Site of Special Scientific Interest and national nature reserve It is a former raised bog lying in the basin of the River Brue. The site supports a diverse community of terrestrial and aquatic invertebrates. National rarities are the large marsh grasshopper (Stethophyma grossum) found on sphagnum moss bogs, the greater silver diving beetle (Hydrophilus piceus) and the lesser silver diving beetle (Hydrochara caraboides) which is now confined nationally to the Brue Basin Peat Moors.

The adjoining Shapwick Moor has been purchased by the Hawk and Owl Trust and will be their first reserve in south west England. The land will be farmed traditionally in order to recreate the habitats of the past. The management plan for the site is being overseen by Natural England. The first steps in the creation of the nature reserve are to reseed the land and then reintroduce Devon ruby red cattle to the site. The priority is to encourage wildlife, not human visitors and there will be no visitor centre or permanent structures, but a public footpath which crosses the site will be improved and hides built along the footpath at key vantage points. Birds identified at the site include: buzzard, sparrowhawk, kestrel, hobby, red kite, barn owl, lapwing, pheasant, cuckoo, woodpecker and skylark.

Religious sites

The Anglican parish Church of St Mary, which was consecrated in 1331, is an anachronism. Parts of the current building including the piscina and font were moved from an earlier church in fields outside the village. Its central tower is a style that was at least a century out of date. It underwent some alteration in the 15th century, particularly to tower and West end, with further restoration in 1861 by George Gilbert Scott. It has been designated as a Grade II* listed building.

Education

Shapwick was home to Shapwick School, founded in Glastonbury 1974, but moved into the village in 1984.
The school closed in 2020. It was a special school for children aged 8 to 18 with dyslexia. Pupils aged 13 to 18 were based at Shapwick Senior School in the village, while those aged 8 to 12 attended Shapwick Prep in nearby Burtle. In November 2010, the school was featured in November a BBC Three documentary Kara Tointon: Don't call me stupid about actress Kara Tointon who suffers from dyslexia.

Transport

Shapwick railway station was a station on the Highbridge branch of the Somerset and Dorset Joint Railway. It opened in 1854 and closed in 1966.

Notable residents

It was the birthplace of Australian politician Henry Strangways in 1832 and Girl Guide leader Joan Marsham in 1888.

Churchill Julius, later the first Archbishop of New Zealand, was briefly Vicar of Shapwick in the 1870s.

In popular culture

In 2012, the musician Jon Brookes (also known as 'The Advisory Circle' of the Ghost Box record label) released an electronica album entitled 'Shapwick' (on the Clay Pipe record label) based on "an imaginary impression of" the village and its surrounding countryside, following an unplanned car journey through the area one autumn evening: "I felt a certain energy around the place. The images created by the trees in the dark conjured inspiration and it struck me that an album could be based on an imaginary impression of this area. I had already recorded some pieces that were in search of a home and the idea formed within seconds."

Shapwick also featured in songwriter Daren Hayman's Thankful Villages project in 2017. Hayman visited each of the 54 villages and recorded songs and interviews with local residents and a short film. The film for Shapwick features Darren performing his song based on the folk tale The Mistletoe Bride in locations around the village.

References

External links

The Shapwick Project, Somerset: A Rural Landscape Explored (2007) edited by Dr Chris Gerrard and Professor Mick Aston

Villages in Sedgemoor
Somerset Levels
Civil parishes in Somerset